The name Estelle has been used for twelve tropical cyclones in the Eastern Pacific Ocean, making Estelle one of the most frequently used Pacific storm names.
 Hurricane Estelle (1960), Category 1 hurricane that affected the coast of Central America and Mexico.
 Tropical Storm Estelle (1968), long-lived tropical storm that dissipated before reaching the Central Pacific.
 Hurricane Estelle (1972), Category 1 hurricane that churned in the open ocean.
 Tropical Storm Estelle (1976), weak and short-lived tropical storm that stayed at sea.
 Tropical Storm Estelle (1980), weak and short-lived tropical storm that stayed at sea.
 Hurricane Estelle (1986), Category 4 hurricane that moved south of Hawaii.
 Hurricane Estelle (1992), Category 4 hurricane that formed far away from the coast.
 Hurricane Estelle (1998), Category 4 hurricane that did not affect land.
 Tropical Storm Estelle (2004), strong tropical storm that moved into the Central Pacific.
 Tropical Storm Estelle (2010), strong tropical storm that formed near Mexico but moved out to sea.
 Tropical Storm Estelle (2016), strong tropical storm that churned in the open ocean.
 Hurricane Estelle (2022), Category 1 hurricane that formed near Mexico but moved out to sea.

Pacific hurricane set index articles